Messanges is a commune in the Landes department in Nouvelle-Aquitaine in south-western France. Messanges is a popular place for tourism but quite empty in the non-holiday season.

See also
Communes of the Landes department

References

Communes of Landes (department)